ACEA, AceA or Acea may refer to:

 Acea, a surname
 Acea (company), originally "Azienda Comunale Elettricità e Acque", an Italian energy and water supply company
 Arachidonyl-2'-chloroethylamide, a chemical compound
European Automobile Manufacturers Association, known in French as "Association des Constructeurs Européens d'Automobiles" or ACEA
 GDP-mannose:cellobiosyl-diphosphopolyprenol alpha-mannosyltransferase, an enzyme
 Acea, the former Spanish name for Kiritimati

See also 

 Licostinel, code named ACEA-1021, a chemical compound
 Trosia acea (or T. acea), a species of moth